Van Slyke Castle, originally known as Foxcroft, is a ruined early 20th century mansion in Wanaque, New Jersey that was built to resemble a castle. 

The home was built by stockbroker William Porter in the 1900s. He named the property Foxcroft, as it was built on Fox Hill. 

The property was abandoned by the 1950s. It was subsequently burned by vandals. 

The castle is located in Ramapo Mountain State Forest, where it is accessible to hikers.

References

Houses in Passaic County, New Jersey
Wanaque, New Jersey